The New York University Journal of Intellectual Property and Entertainment Law (or JIPEL) 
is a student-edited law review at New York University School of Law. The journal 
publishes articles, essays, notes, and commentary that cover a wide range of topics in 
intellectual property law and entertainment law.

JIPEL was first published by NYU's Intellectual Property 
and Entertainment Law Society in 2009 as the IP and Entertainment Law Ledger, before being 
spun off as an independent journal in 2011. It features 
articles and essays on legal topics by practitioners and academics, as well as notes, case comments, and book annotations 
written by journal members.

JIPEL publishes two issues per year on diverse topics in intellectual property and entertainment 
law. Past articles have been cited in criminal cases and Supreme Court filings. It was recognized both in and out of legal circles in 2020 for publishing a legal article co-authored by the rapper Pitbull.

References

External links  
 

American law journals
New York University academic journals
English-language journals
Law journals edited by students
Entertainment law journals
Publications established in 2011
Intellectual property law journals
Biannual journals